Who's Harry Crumb? is a 1989 American comedy-mystery film featuring John Candy as the title character. Paul Flaherty directed the film, which co-stars Annie Potts, Jeffrey Jones and Shawnee Smith. An uncredited cameo appearance is made by Jim Belushi. The story concerns the often incompetent, sometimes brilliant, private investigator Harry Crumb, who searches for a kidnapping victim.

Plot
While visiting a health studio in Beverly Hills, fashion model Jennifer Downing, the daughter of millionaire P.J. Downing, is kidnapped. Her father turns to a family friend, Eliot Draisen, who is president of the detective agency Crumb & Crumb, to investigate the case.

Eliot is reluctant to supply P.J. with one of his capable detectives because, as it turns out, Eliot himself is the organizer of the kidnapping. To give the appearance of taking the investigation seriously, Eliot offers P.J. the services of Harry Crumb, the last descendant of the agency's founders. Eliot knows that Harry is incompetent and counts on this fact to get away with the crime.

Harry returns to Los Angeles (by bus) from an assignment in the firm's Tulsa, Oklahoma branch office (which he messed up, as usual). He is assisted in his investigation by P.J.'s younger daughter, Nikki, who is considerably smarter than he is. Harry deduces that Nikki's stepmother, Helen Downing, is having an affair with tennis coach Vince Barnes, and concludes she is behind the kidnapping. Helen is desired by Eliot, but all she is interested in is money. She tries to get rid of her husband on several occasions and does her best – along with Barnes – to get the ransom for herself.

Also assigned to the case is Police Detective Casey, who (unlike Harry) is competent and experienced in kidnapping cases and has a strongly negative opinion of private eyes.

Eliot escapes to the airport, bound for Buenos Aires. He makes the mistake of informing Helen of his plans; she and Barnes take the money and leave him bound and gagged. Harry arrives to confront Helen and Barnes just as their plane prepares to take off. Jennifer is freed and Eliot is found.

Falsely believing Harry has deduced his part in the kidnapping and exasperated with Harry's dumb luck, Eliot confesses and is taken into police custody. Harry is thanked for his heroism in the case and even Det. Casey applauds Harry for solving the case. In the end, Harry takes over as the new president of his family's business, and promptly accepts a new assignment to investigate another case, this time a murder committed in a gay bar.

Cast

John Candy as Harry Crumb
Jeffrey Jones as Eliot Draisen
Annie Potts as Helen Downing
Tim Thomerson as Vince Barnes
Barry Corbin as P.J. Downing
Shawnee Smith as Nikki Downing
Valri Bromfield as Detective Casey
Renée Coleman as Jennifer Downing
Wesley Mann as Tim
Doug Steckler as Dwayne
Tamsin Kelsey as Marie
Joe Flaherty as Doorman
Lori O'Byrne as Karen
Michele Goodger as Mrs. MacIntyre
Beverley Elliott as Joanne
P. Lynn Johnson as Kelly
Peter Yunker as Jeffrey Brandt
Garwin Sanford as Dennis Kimball
Tony Dakota as Freddy
Manny Perry as Cop in Car
Tino Insana as Smokey
Deanna Oliver as Woman in Apartment
Jim Belushi as Man on Bus (uncredited)

Box office
Who's Harry Crumb? grossed $10,982,364 in North America. The film was released in the United Kingdom on July 6, 1989, and failed to reach the Top 15.

Reception
The review aggregator website Rotten Tomatoes reported an approval rating of 27%, with an average rating of 4.03/10, based on eleven reviews. In March 2018, Den of Geek included the film as one of "The Underrated Movies of 1989", commenting "In truth, Who's Harry Crumb? isn't necessarily vintage Candy either, but it's still a lot of fun, and gives him a title role that he clearly enjoyed."

References

External links
 Who's Harry Crumb? at TheGreatWhiteDope's Mecha-Blog-Zilla

 
 Who's Harry Crumb? at the New York Times
 

1989 films
1980s comedy mystery films
1980s comedy thriller films
American comedy thriller films
American comedy mystery films
American detective films
Films about kidnapping
Films set in Los Angeles
NBC Productions films
TriStar Pictures films
Films scored by Michel Colombier
1989 comedy films
Films produced by Arnon Milchan
1980s English-language films
Films directed by Paul Flaherty
1980s American films